The 2016 European Boxing Olympic Qualification Tournament for the boxing tournament at the 2016 Summer Olympics in Rio de Janeiro, Brazil, were held from April 9 to April 17, 2016 in the Mustafa Dağıstanlı Sports Hall at İlkadım, Samsun, Turkey.

Medalists

Men

Women

Qualification summary

Results

Men

Light flyweight (49 kg)
The top three boxers qualified to the 2016 Summer Olympics.

Flyweight (52 kg)
The top three boxers qualified to the 2016 Summer Olympics.

Bantamweight (56 kg)
The top three boxers qualified to the 2016 Summer Olympics.

Lightweight (60 kg)
The top three boxers qualified to the 2016 Summer Olympics.

Light welterweight (64 kg)
The top three boxers qualified to the 2016 Summer Olympics.

Welterweight (69 kg)
The top three boxers qualified to the 2016 Summer Olympics.

Middleweight (75 kg)
The top three boxers qualified to the 2016 Summer Olympics.

Light heavyweight (81 kg)
The top three boxers qualified to the 2016 Summer Olympics.

Heavyweight (91 kg)
The top three boxers qualified to the 2016 Summer Olympics.

Super heavyweight (+91 kg)
The top three boxers qualified to the 2016 Summer Olympics.

Women

Flyweight (51 kg)
The two finalists qualified to the 2016 Summer Olympics.

Lightweight (60 kg)
The two finalists qualified to the 2016 Summer Olympics.

Middleweight (75 kg)
The two finalists qualified to the 2016 Summer Olympics.

References

Boxing Olympic Qualification European
Boxing qualification for the 2016 Summer Olympics
2016 in Turkish sport
Sports competitions in Samsun